Simpson Harris Morgan (1821 – December 15, 1864) was a prominent Confederate politician who represented Texas in the Second Confederate Congress in 1864. He was the father-in-law of Albert Bacon Fall.

External links
The Political Graveyard

1821 births
1864 deaths
People from Rutherford County, Tennessee
People from Clarksville, Texas
Members of the Confederate House of Representatives from Texas
19th-century American politicians
Deaths from pneumonia in Arkansas